Elvis is a 1979 American made-for-television biographical film aired on ABC. It was directed by John Carpenter and starring Kurt Russell as Elvis Presley. It marked the first collaboration between Carpenter and Russell.

After its success on television in the United States, a shorter re-edited version of Elvis was released theatrically throughout Europe and Australia. It was nominated for a Golden Globe Award for Best Motion Picture Made for Television, and for three Primetime Emmy Awards, including Outstanding Lead Actor in a Miniseries or a Movie for Russell.

Synopsis 
In July 1969, Elvis Presley is performing at his first live performance in eight years at the International Hotel in Las Vegas.  While in his suite, Elvis worries about this and remembers how he became the King of Rock and Roll.

Cast

Production 
Carpenter wanted to make the film because "I wanted to work with actors. I wanted to do a dramatic film. I wanted to do something different. And Elvis was the first thing that came along that I had any feeling for, personally-because I did have a feeling for Elvis, I liked him very much, cared about him. So it seemed like a pretty good package when it arrived. After it was over I was disappointed in some of my work, and I was disappointed that I didn't have more participation in the editing."

Carpenter says the film involved 150 locations and was shot over 30 days. "Some of the days we were moving to three and four different locations," he said. "When you have a big union crew with a lot of trucks and bullshit, you have to run very fast. You have to shoot something in the morning, shoot something in mid-afternoon, and shoot something right before you quit at night. That's what happened. We were just running."

Carpenter was not able to edit or score the film and found it an unhappy experience.

Russell worked with and met Elvis in the film It Happened at the World's Fair (1963). In the film, Elvis wants to meet the fairground's nurse and he pays a young boy, played by the twelve-year-old Russell, to kick him in the shins. Later in the film, he sees Elvis and the nurse together on a date and asks if he can kick him again for money. Russell also dubbed the voice of a young Elvis in Forrest Gump (1994), and played an Elvis impersonator in the film 3000 Miles to Graceland (2001).

Country singer Ronnie McDowell provided the vocals for a number of songs Russell performed in the film. McDowell recorded 36 songs for the soundtrack, of which 25 were used.

There is a continuity error, as the last song Presley performs at his 1970 concert is "An American Trilogy," a song Presley himself did not release, or include in any concerts, until 1972.

According to several reports, Priscilla Presley was paid $50,000 to check the script for accuracy before shooting commenced.

Reception 

Elvis originally aired on ABC opposite two blockbuster films; Gone with the Wind (1939) on CBS, and One Flew Over the Cuckoo's Nest (1975) on NBC. Despite this, Elvis beat both in the Nielsen ratings, receiving a 27.3 rating compared to 24.3 and 22.5 respectively. Elvis was ranked the sixth most watched program of the week.

After its success on television, a shortened version of the film was released theatrically throughout Europe. The film debuted on DVD in early 2010 and on Blu-ray in 2016 via Shout! Factory. The Blu-ray disc edition is presented in a 1.78:1 aspect ratio, in contrast to the original 1.33:1 televised presentation, or the 1.66:1 European theatrical release.

The film was met with mixed to positive reviews, with many critics praising the make-up, costume design, cinematography, and Russell's performance, yet some criticized the film's screenplay.

A shorter, re-edited version of Elvis, was released theatrically throughout Europe and Australia. It grossed $50,000 in its opening weekend in Australia in August and grossed $350,000 in 3 weeks. It grossed $25,000 in its first 10 days in Helsinki, Finland.

Accolades

Legacy 
Elvis is notable in Carpenter's career for two reasons. It was made after Halloween (1978) had wrapped, so it offered him an avenue to try his hand at a film away from the horror genre. It was also the first time Carpenter had worked with Kurt Russell, who became a frequent collaborator of Carpenter's. Russell subsequently starred in Escape from New York (1981), The Thing (1982), Big Trouble in Little China (1986) and Escape from L.A. (1996).

Russell married co-star Season Hubley on March 17, 1979, and they divorced in 1983. Bing Russell, who played Vernon Presley, is Kurt Russell's real father. For several years Bing played Deputy Clem Poster in the TV series Bonanza.

Charts

See also 
 Elvis miniseries

References

External links 
 
 

1979 television films
1979 films
1970s biographical drama films
Films set in 1956
Films set in 1970
ABC network original films
American biographical films
American musical drama films
American rock music films
Films directed by John Carpenter
Rockabilly
Films about Elvis Presley
Musical films based on actual events
Films scored by Joe Renzetti
1970s English-language films
ABC Motion Pictures films
1970s American films